Hazel Eyes, I Will Lead You is an album by Josephine Foster, released in 2005.

Track listing
"The Siren's Admonition" – 4:24
"Hazel Eyes, I Will Lead You" – 3:26
"By the Shape of Your Pearls" – 1:22
"Stones Throw from Heaven" – 3:18
"Where There Are Trees" – 1:22
"The Golden Wooden Tone" – 3:01
"There Are Eyes Above" – 3:50
"Celebrant's Song" – 3:41
"Good News" – 3:07
"Trees Lay By" – 2:59
"The Pruner's Pair" – 3:10
"Crackerjack Fool" – 2:40
"The Way Is Sweetly Mown" – 4:44
"Hominy Grits" – 2:21

References

2005 albums
Josephine Foster albums